Robert Robinson (27 September 1735 – 9 June 1790) was an English Dissenter, influential Baptist and scholar who made a lifelong study of the antiquity and history of Christian Baptism. He was also author of the hymns "Come Thou Fount of Every Blessing" and "Mighty God, while angels bless Thee", the former of which he wrote at age 22 after converting to Methodism. The latter was later set to music by Dr John Randall, Music Professor at Cambridge University.

Early life
Robert Robinson was born in Swaffham in Norfolk, on 27 September 1735, to Michael Robinson, a customs officer, and Mary Wilkin, who had married by license at Lakenheath, Suffolk, 28 March 1723. His father died when he was aged five, but his maternal grandfather, Robert Wilkin, a wealthy gentleman of Mildenhall, who had never reconciled himself to his daughter’s lowly marriage, disinherited his grandson, with an inheritance of ten shillings and sixpence. Robinson’s uncle, a farmer, had sponsored Robinson’s attendance at a school at Scarning, near Dereham, Norfolk, under Rev. Joseph Brett. When he was fourteen, Robinson was sent to London as apprentice to Joseph Anderson, a hairdresser of Crutched Friars; though Robinson continued an avid reader.

Robinson pursued a detailed study of the Scriptures and early Christian authors, which soon convinced him of the inefficacy of infant baptism, compared with the baptism of believing adults. This caused him some difficulty after he settled in Cambridge, and where he had a large family of twelve unbaptized children.

In 1752, Robinson was briefly converted to Evangelical Methodism on hearing the Calvinist George Whitefield, and in 1758 he spent a few months at a Calvinistic Methodist Chapel in Mildenhall. He was then invited to assist William Cudworth at the Calvinistic Methodist Norwich Tabernacle, but after a matter of weeks seceded to form a new Congregational Chapel in St Paul's parish, Norwich. In January 1759, he moved again, to Stone-Yard Baptist Chapel, Cambridge (St Andrew's Street Baptist Church), where he remained the rest of his life, first as Lecturer and then, from 1762, as Pastor.  A new chapel was built for him in 1764. His congregation came to number more than a thousand. Robinson was able to buy an eighty-acre farm by the river at Chesterton, where he kept cattle and sheep, grew barley and wheat, and dealt as a corn and coal merchant with barges plying the Cam.

Ministry and later life
Robinson's friends and occasional hearers at Cambridge included the Professor of Music, Dr John Randall (1715–99); Thomas Fyshe Palmer (1747–1802); John Hammond; Robert Tyrwhitt; and William Frend (1757–1841).

Robinson was anxious to meet Joseph Priestley in Birmingham, and travelled there at the beginning of June 1790. On Sunday 6 June, he preached two Charity Sermons, in the morning at Priestley's New Meeting Chapel, and in the afternoon at the Old Meeting Birmingham, both in aid of the Sunday Schools of the Old and New Meetings. While in Birmingham, Robinson stayed in Showell Green, at the home of the Unitarian benefactor William Russell (1740–1818), Priestley's friend and sponsor at Birmingham. It was here that he died, in his sleep, in the early hours of Wednesday 9 June 1790.

Robinson was interred in the Dissenters' Burial Ground at Birmingham, the ceremony being performed by Priestley.

Views

Although Robinson had argued against Unitarianism for most his life, Joshua Toulmin records in his funeral sermon, quoting a letter Robinson had written 5 January 1788, that Robinson converted to Unitarianism. Robinson however, seemed to rebuff the notion that he doubted the full divinity of Jesus Christ, a doctrine held by the Unitarian Church. In a sermon he preached after he was accused of becoming a Unitarian, Robinson clearly declared that Jesus was God, and added, "Christ in Himself is a person infinitely lovely as both God and man."

Works
Of Robinson's publications, his most prominent are: Arcana, or the Principles of the Late Petitioners to Parliament for Relief in the Matter of Subscription (1774); A Plea for the Divinity of our Lord Jesus Christ in a Pastoral Letter to a Congregation of Protestant Dissenters at Cambridge (1776); History and Mystery of Good Friday (1777); History of Baptism and Baptists (1790); and the posthumously printed Ecclesiastical Researches (1792).

References

External links
 
 Biography at Stem Publishing
 
 

English hymnwriters
Christian hymnwriters
1735 births
1790 deaths
18th-century English Baptist ministers
People from Swaffham
People from Chesterton, Cambridge